Peter Hammerschlag (27 June 1902, Alsergrund, Vienna  1942, Auschwitz concentration camp) was an Austrian writer, surrealist poet, actor, Kabarett artist and graphic artist. He was known for his cabarets, which continue to influence the arts in Austria today, and in 2007, was honoured on the Walk of Fame of Cabaret. Hammerschlag was granted an exit permit to leave Austria for Argentina in September 1941, he was, however, unable to obtain a passport through any channels. Later that year he was put into a forced labour camp, and in 1942, he was murdered in the Auschwitz concentration camp. His work has been on display at the City of Vienna's Jewish Museum.

References

External links

 

1902 births
1942 deaths
Austrian people who died in Auschwitz concentration camp
Austrian artists
20th-century Austrian poets
Austrian male poets
Kabarettists
Jewish Austrian writers
Jewish artists
Jewish Austrian male actors
People from Alsergrund
Austrian civilians killed in World War II
Austrian Jews who died in the Holocaust
Writers from Vienna